Norman Anstey, is a South African actor, singer, voice artist, presenter and MC. He is best known for the roles in the television serials such as; Black Sails, Heartlines, and Snitch.

Personal life
Norman Anstey was born in Johannesburg, South Africa. He completed education from many schools including Rudolf Steiner School in Chambi-sur-Montreux, Switzerland. Then he studied drama at the De Leon Drama School in Richmond, Surrey UK. Before starting drama career, he worked as a tour guide on Dalmatian Coast, then as a shipping clerk at Automobile Association SA, and an office worker at Die Afrikaanse Pers and functions Barman.

He is married to Penny, who was a ballet dancer with PACT ballet. The couple has two daughters: Amy and Jay, are both actresses. His daughter Jay Anstey has made several notable roles in the films Sleeper's Wake, Farewell Ella Bella, Tremors: A Cold Day in Hell, and Hell Trip.

Career
He started theatre career in 1976 with the play Journey's End. Then he moved Johannesburg and Pretoria with many theatre productions such as; The Deep Blue Sea, Fringe Benefits, Rosencrantz and Guildenstern, The Crucible, The Front Page, Anyone for Denis, Stevie, Ross. Apart from them, he also performed in the musicals such as Evita, The King and I, Fings Aint Wot They Used To Be and The Boys in the Photograph. Before starting television acting, he made extensive appearances in commercials such as "a clueless cellphone owner" in a series of commercials for Vodacom. In 1987, he made a guest role in the TV1 drama Ballade Vir 'n Enkeling.

Then his first notable television role came through the M-Net drama series Snitch in 2004, where he played one of the lead roles as "Hilton Aimes". In the next year, he reprised his role in the second season as well. In 2006, he appeared in two television serials: as "Arnie Katz" in the SABC3 drama The Lab and then as "Tom Anderson" in the SABC2 anthology drama Heartlines. In 2007, he played the role of "Arnoldus van der Watt" in the SABC2 comedy Andries Plak. In the same year, he joined with the kykNET drama Dryfsand and played the role "Dr. Jonker".

In 2008 he played the lead role of "Zac's father" in the M-Net drama series Innocent Times. Then in 2012, he appeared in the fifth season of popular M-Net drama Jacob's Cross with the role "McKenzie". In 2014, he played the supportive role as "Reverend" in the first season of kykNET anthology serial Pandjieswinkelstories. In 2015, he got the opportunity to join with the international drama thriller series Black Sails for the second season, where he played the role of "Merchant Captain". In 2016, he played the role "Dudi Oz" in another kykNET thriller Fluiters.

In cinema, he appeared in the films such as; Goodbye Bafana, Dream Forest, Scavengers, The Revenger, Second Skin, Reason To Die, and Rage To Kill.

Filmography

References

External links
 IMDb
 career images

Living people
South African male film actors
South African male television actors
South African male stage actors
People from Johannesburg
South African singers
Year of birth missing (living people)